Peter Merideth is an American attorney and politician serving as a member of the Missouri House of Representatives from the 80th district. Elected in November 2016, he assumed office in 2017.

Early life and education 
Merideth was born and raised in Shaw, St. Louis. After graduating from St. Louis University High School, he earned a Bachelor of Music degree in musical theatre from the Catholic University of America and a Juris Doctor from the Washington University School of Law.

Career 
Merideth is a counsel at Dearing & Hartzog, L.C. He also served as a member of the St. Louis City Board of Equalization. He was elected to the Missouri House of Representatives in November 2016 and assumed office in 2017. Merideth also serves as ranking minority member of the House General Laws Committee and House Budget Committee. During the 2020 legislative session, Merideth introduced legislation to legalize recreational marijuana in Missouri.

Electoral History

References 

Living people
People from St. Louis
Politicians from St. Louis
Catholic University of America alumni
Washington University School of Law alumni
Democratic Party members of the Missouri House of Representatives
21st-century American politicians
Year of birth missing (living people)